Bolma opaoana is a species of sea snail, a marine gastropod mollusk in the family Turbinidae, the turban snails.

Description
The size of the shell attains 30 mm.

Distribution
This marine species occurs off New Caledonia.

References

 Bouchet, P. & Métivier, B., 1983. -The genus Bolma (Mollusca: Gastropoda) in the bathyal zone of New Caledonia with description of a new species. Venus 42(1): 8-12

External links
 To World Register of Marine Species
 

opaoana
Gastropods described in 1983